A list of Spanish-produced and co-produced feature films released in 2012 in Spain. The domestic theatrical release date is favoured.

Films

Box office 
The ten highest-grossing Spanish films in 2012, by domestic box office gross revenue, are as follows:

See also 
 27th Goya Awards

Informational notes

References

External links
 Spanish films of 2012 at the Internet Movie Database

2012
Spanish
Films